Simon William Ferry (born 11 January 1988) is a Scottish semi-professional footballer and coach who is manager for Broomhill.

Ferry started his career with Scottish Premier League club Celtic but did not play a competitive match for the first team. He spent the 2009–10 season on loan at Swindon Town who then signed him permanently at the end of the season. He then moved to Portsmouth.

In June 2014, he joined Dundee and spent just over one year at the club before joining Peterhead.

Ferry has played for the Scotland national under-19 football team and featured for them at the 2006 European Under-19 Championship.

Club career

Celtic
Having played for the Celtic youth teams, Ferry signed a four-and-a-half-year professional contract with the club in January 2006. He was part of the team that won the Under-19 League and Cup double in 2006 and was among a number of players named, by coach Willie McStay, as likely to progress to the first team.

A few months later Ferry made his first-team debut on a pre-season tour of Poland, playing against Wisła Kraków and Legia Warsaw.

His professional development was curtailed by injury problems sustained in the 2006–07 season, which resulted in his missing almost three years of club football. He returned to the Celtic first-team squad in February 2009, and featured in a Wembley Cup match against Tottenham Hotspur on 26 July 2009. Ferry later told BBC Wiltshire that he feared the ongoing ankle injury would end his career.

Swindon Town
On 27 August 2009, Ferry joined Swindon Town on loan until January 2010 along with Celtic teammate Ben Hutchinson. He made his debut for Swindon on 29 August, receiving the club's Man of the Match award in a 2–1 victory against Southend United. Two months later he scored his first goal for the club, on 31 October 2009, in a 4–1 win over Tranmere Rovers.

A week after scoring his first goal, on 26 November 2009, it was announced that a deal had been agreed with parent club Celtic to extend the loan until the end of the season. Ferry stated he would like to stay at the club and revealed he had adapted easily to life on and off the pitch at Swindon Town. On 23 February 2010, Ferry scored in a 4–1 win over Stockport County. After the match, he said he 'blacked out' when he scored and didn't remember the goal.

Ferry scored an own goal in Swindon's play-off semi-final win over Charlton Athletic in May 2010. Swindon would lose to Millwall in the play-off final, missing out on promotion to the Championship (Ferry started in the final). Despite the loss, Ferry stated playing at Wembley was a good stage in his career, describing as "need to jump one way or the other" At the end of the season, Ferry was recalled by parent club Celtic, according to the club's chairman Andrew Fitton.

On 2 August 2010, Ferry signed a permanent deal with Swindon, along with Celtic teammate, defender Paul Caddis. Ferry previously stated his wanted his move to Swindon Town turned to a permanent deal. Shortly after the permanent move, Ferry stated that moving to Swindon permanently was a relief after the move was described as "deed in the water".

Ferry's first game after signing for the club on a permanent basis came in the opening game of the season, coming on as a substitute for David Prutton, in a 2–1 loss against Brighton & Hove Albion. A month later Ferry went on the sidelines, having suffered an ankle injury in training which left him out for two weeks. He returned from injury on 28 September 2010, coming on as a substitute for Thomas Dossevi, in a 3–2 loss against Plymouth Argyle. Since then, Ferry featured on the bench, being unused, as he made 21 appearances. The club was relegated after losing 3–1 against Sheffield Wednesday. This incident led to Ferry and Hart falling out and it was revealed that Ferry considered quitting the club.

The next season, with the appointment of Paolo Di Canio as Swindon manager, Ferry believed he could look forward to life at the club. Soon after, Di Canio revealed that Ferry almost left the club about three weeks after being behind Oliver Risser, Jonathan Smith and Alan McCormack in the pecking order for a place in the centre of midfield. He also said on Ferry that "I was not happy with the way he behaved, not that he was lazy because he always trained well but he did not show me the real desire to do something more and try to put the opponent under pressure. But he has shown to me in the last 10 days though that he has improved and I told him that he deserves to play on occasion." Eventually, Di Canio insists Ferry will stay at the club, having featured him in the first team this season.

Having featured in eight out of nine games for Swindon Town, Ferry overly praised Di Canio's squad selection and was then immediately dropped from his first team plan. Di Canio praised Ferry on his home form, describing him as the main player that pressed everywhere and challenged every ball. Ferry scored his first goal on his return and first since moving to Swindon permanently, in a 3–3 draw against Hereford United on 8 October 2011. A month later he scored his first FA Cup goal, during a 4–1 defeat of Huddersfield Town of League One. In a 2–1 win over Wigan in the third round of the FA Cup, Ferry and the rest of the team were awarded the Ronnie Radford Award.

In mid-April, with Swindon Town in the brink of promotion, Ferry was among several players on a wild night out after a match against Plymouth Argyle and was later forced to apologise by releasing a statement on the club website saying they had "let their standards massively slip". Despite the incident, Di Canio forgave the players, including Ferry after a warning to never let him down again. After the club's promotion return to League One, Ferry wad once again praised by Di Canio. During the season, Ferry made the most appearances with the club, making 53 appearances.

The next season, with the club's promotion return to League One, Ferry continued to maintain his first team place at Swindon Town. For the first time, Ferry was named in League One Team of the Week on 1 October 2012 when he scored in a 1–0 win against Shrewsbury Town. In November, Ferry was named captain, ahead of a match against Macclesfield Town in the first round of the FA Cup, but lost 2–0. Shortly after this, Ferry scored his second goal of the season in a 2–0 win over Walsall and the following week, he also provided four assists (for Andy Williams and Darren Ward) in a 4–1 win over Yeovil Town. In the last two games in early March, Ferry started playing on the right side of midfield, under newly manager Kevin MacDonald, mainly due to lack of options in that position. Ferry then scored two goals in two consecutive games, against Walsall and Brentford. In a match against Brentford, Ferry was, once again, named in League One Team of the Week for the second time on 12 March 2013.

In June, Ferry was swiftly released by Swindon, as the club's playing budget was halved. Shortly being released by the club, Ferry went on Yeovil Town as a trialist. After featured in the friendly match against Poole Town, the club decided against signing Ferry.

Portsmouth
On 25 July 2013, Ferry signed a two-year contract with Portsmouth, on a free transfer. Upon joining Portsmouth, Manager Guy Whittingham described Ferry as someone he needs, due to being "extremely fit and his work-rate is fantastic, something our fans demand. He's also somebody who can link play, be defending our box one minute and the next attacking the opposition. I think his all-round game is very good. Simon is a big part of what we want to achieve."

He made his debut in a 4–1 home defeat to Oxford United on 3 August 2013. On 14 September, Ferry scored his first Pompey goal, in a 2–1 away victory over Burton Albion. After scoring against Burton Albion, Ferry believes the club need to perform well if they were to become a serious contender in League Two. Ferry was, at the time, started every league game for the Blues until he sustained a hamstring injury.

After missing out three games, Ferry made his return on 26 October 2013, as Portsmouth drew 1–1 with Torquay United. After the draw with Torquay United, Ferry was happy to make his return after being on the sidelines. The next game against Exeter City, on 2 November 2013, Ferry was captain when they won 3–2. Ferry would sustained a hamstring and back injury that kept him out for months. After three months out, Ferry made his return and was captain, as Portsmouth won 1–0 against Hartlepool United. Ferry was captain again during a match against Dagenham & Redbridge in the next game. But during the match, Ferry forced to come off in the 38th minute and was substituted, though Portsmouth would win 4–1. After the match, it announced that Ferry missed the rest of the season because of his back injury.

After one season with Portsmouth, Ferry left Portsmouth by mutual consent despite having one-year contract left and was rumoured to leave for Scotland.

Dundee
On 7 June 2014, Ferry moved back to Scotland, where he signed for Dundee, becoming the sixth signing of the season, ahead of their Scottish Premiership campaign, following their promotion. Upon the move to Dundee, Manager Paul Hartley said that signing Ferry would boost the club's attack saying: "He played the last year as a sitting midfielder but I see his strengths in attacking and going forward with the ball. He is young and dynamic and has proved himself in England at a very decent level."

He scored on his debut for Dundee, a 4–0 win against Peterhead in the first round of the Scottish League Cup. Ferry made his league debut for Dundee, in the opening game of the season, in a 1–1 draw against Kilmarnock. However, his time at Dundee were shattered over suffering injuries twice. Despite the injuries, Ferry made twenty-two appearances and scored once in all competitions. On 31 August 2015, he was released by from his contract by mutual consent.

Peterhead
Two years after playing in a play-off final to reach the second tier of English football, Ferry signed part-time for Scottish third-tier side Peterhead in September 2015. Ferry scored an own goal on his full debut against Stirling Albion, leading to a 1–0 defeat. Ferry also scored an own goal for Airdrieonians in his final game for Peterhead, leading to a 1–1 draw. He departed the club in May 2022.

International career
In July 2006, Ferry played for Scotland at the 2006 European Under-19 Championship. The Scottish team reached the final, in which Ferry played, but they lost to Spain.

Due to injury, he missed the 2007 FIFA Under-20 World Cup.

Coaching 
During his time at Peterhead, Ferry worked as the first team coach under manager Jim McInally, as well as a youth coach for Celtic. In May 2022, after Ferry's entertainment brand Open Goal agreed a partnership with the club, Ferry was announced as the manager of Lowland League side Broomhill.

Media career
Struggling to support his family while balancing a Royal Mail night-shift job with his part-time Peterhead career, Ferry received a call regarding starting a wee podcast, titled Keeping the Ball on the Ground, which would feature interviews with footballers and inside-the-dressing-room anecdotes. "I'd never, ever heard of a podcast. At that time, I was writing a lot of shite on Twitter, and people found it quite funny, so it got a lot of retweets. He's obviously seen my Twitter and thought 'You'll be good for this.'" Kevin Thomson, Ferry's former teammate at Dundee, agreed that he would be perfect for the role, having been on the receiving end of Ferry's endless questions in the Dens Park dressing room.

Ferry hosts an interview segment on Open Goal's YouTube channel. Titled Si Ferry Meets..., he has interviewed football players and managers such as Andy Robertson, Ally McCoist, John Hartson, Barry Ferguson, David Moyes, David Marshall, Ian Durrant, Leigh Griffiths, Kenny Miller, Jamie Carragher, Jonathan Woodgate and Gordon Strachan. Ferry also hosts Open Goal's Keeping the Ball on the Ground, discussing Scottish football with former professional footballers Kevin Kyle, Derek Ferguson, Frank McAvennie and Paul Slane, along with active player Andy Halliday, with guest appearances from other Scottish football and cultural personalities.

Personal life
To supplement his part-time role at Peterhead, in 2015 Ferry delivered kitchens in the Dundee area for Kevin McBride for £250 a week. After leaving McBride's business and moving with his family to Springburn, he began work at the Royal Mail depot in Stepps, walking the one-hour journey each night to work the night shift.

He has two children with his wife Stephanie.

Career statistics

Managerial statistics

Honours
Swindon Town
 Football League Two: 2011–12

Peterhead
 Scottish League Two: 2018–19

References

External links

1988 births
Footballers from Dundee
Living people
Association football midfielders
Scottish footballers
Celtic F.C. players
Swindon Town F.C. players
Portsmouth F.C. players
Dundee F.C. players
Peterhead F.C. players
English Football League players
Scotland youth international footballers
Scottish Professional Football League players
Scottish sports broadcasters
Celtic F.C. non-playing staff
Association football coaches
Scottish football managers
Lowland Football League managers